Combat Logistics Battalion 8 (CLB-8) is a logistics battalion of the United States Marine Corps. It is part of Combat Logistics Regiment 2 and the 2nd Marine Logistics Group. The unit is based out of the Marine Corps Base Camp Lejeune, North Carolina.

Mission

Combat Logistics Battalion 8 provides medium and heavy-lift motor transport support.

Subordinate units
 Motor Transportation Company
 Headquarters and Service Company

History
Combat Service Support Detachment 28 (CSSD-28) was commissioned on September 20, 2004. CSSD-28 was assigned to the 2d Force Service Support Group. On March 13, 2005, CSSD-28 was re-designated as Combat Logistics Battalion 8. 

CLB 8 deployed to Camp Fallujah, Iraq in support of Operation Iraqi Freedom from February 2005 to February 2006 and from September 2007 to March 2008. During these deployments, CLB 8 sailors and Marines dispatched approximately 100 combat logistics patrols that provided units with supply for combat operations. The battalion was also responsible for material handling missions, augmenting military police, conducting escort, road sweep, road repair, and explosive disposal missions. It also conducted vehicle recovery missions and contact team visits and provided a squad of female Marines to assist in screening and searching Iraqi women at entry control points and checkpoints. Finally, the battalion's engineers constructed vital control points throughout the area of operation and provided engineer services to the II MEF Headquarters as well as Iraqi Security Forces. 

The battalion deployed to Afghanistan from May to December of 2009 as part of the 2nd Marine Expeditionary Brigade. 
 CLB 8 was part of the 17,000-troop increase announced by President Obama in mid-February 2009. The battalion deployed to Afghanistan again from January to August 2011, and January to July 2013. During these deployments, CLB 8 sailors and Marines conducted convoy operations, route security, road sweeps, and maintenance and explosive ordnance removal support. In 2011, CLB 8 conducted a six day convoy that escorted the Logistics Kandak (Battalion) of the 215th Corps of the Afghan National Army to its headquarters in Helmand Province, Afghanistan.  The convoy consisted of over 100 vehicles and 600 personnel from the ANA and U.S. Marine Corps. 

Two months after its 2009 deployment to Afghanistan, CLB 8 was deployed in support of Operation Unified Response. This mission was a humanitarian operation that provided relief to the Haitian people after the devastating 2010 earthquake.

Four months after returning from its third Afghan mission, CLB 8 was deactivated aboard Marine Corps Base Camp Lejeune, North Carolina.  The colors were furled on November 7, 2013. Just shy of two years from its deactivation date, CLB 8's colors flew again when, on October 1, 2015, the battalion was reactivated and assigned to Combat Logistics Regiment 2. Since reactivation, CLB 8 has deployed twice in support of the Special Purpose MAGTF Crisis Response Africa and the Marine Rotational Force – Europe, and has provided the II MEF with crucial logistics support.

Past Leaders

See also

 List of United States Marine Corps battalions
 Organization of the United States Marine Corps

References
Notes

Web

 CLB-8's official website

CLB8